Canyu, also known as Participation or Participation Network,  is a United States-based rights protection and pro-democracy website, focusing on China's democracy movement,  human rights situation,  and commentary critical of the Chinese Communist Party. 

Canyu.org was launched in 2005 and is maintained by the China Free Press.  Due to the stand of the website, it received many cyberattacks made by hackers.  In January 2014, Canyu issued a statement stating that the website had been funded by the National Endowment for Democracy from 2005 to September 30, 2012.

Hacked
In January 2010, Canyu was hit by DDoS attacks, which prevented access to the website and resulted in the violation and destruction of the background data. In December 2016, canyu.org was hacked again by DDoS attacks.

References

Human rights in China
American news websites
2005 establishments in the United States